Jin Jingzhu (born 5 January 1992) is a Chinese speed skater. She competed at the 2022 Winter Olympics, in Women's 500 metres, and Women's 1000 metres.

She competed at the 2018-19 ISU Speed Skating World Cup, and 2019-20 ISU Speed Skating World Cup.

She is Korean-Chinese.

References

External links

1992 births
Living people
Chinese female speed skaters
Chinese female short track speed skaters
Olympic speed skaters of China
Speed skaters at the 2022 Winter Olympics
20th-century Chinese women
21st-century Chinese women
World Single Distances Speed Skating Championships medalists